Boris Vladimirovich Klyuyev (13 July 1944 — 1 September 2020) was a Soviet and Russian actor and theatre teacher. He served as one of the lead actors of the Maly Theatre from 1969 to 2020 and taught acting technique in Shchepkin Higher Theatre School. He was named a People's Artist of Russia in 2002. He died on 1 September 2020 at the age of 76 from lung cancer.

Biography 
Boris Klyuyev was born in Moscow. He spent his childhood in the area of the Patriarch Ponds. When Boris was four years old, his father Vladimir Klyuyev died from a heart attack at the age of 36. Due to the difficult financial situation in the family, Boris had to unload wagons since he was 13. He started working at a construction site at the age of 16.

After graduating from school Klyuyev entered Shchepkin Higher Theatre School. In a year he joined the Soviet Army and served for three years. During his army service, he took part in the extras on the set of Sergei Bondarchuk's War and Peace. Klyuyev returned to the theatre school after demobilization and served as the school's Komsomol secretary. He graduated from Shchepkin Higher Theatre School in 1969. After that he was offered to join the troupe of the Maly Theatre.

During his fourth year at the theatre school, Klyuyev started his film career. His first significant role was Vasily Shulgin in The Fall of the Empire (1971). Klyuyev became famous across the country for portraying Comte de Rochefort in Georgi Yungvald-Khilkevich's D'Artagnan and Three Musketeers (1978) and Mycroft Holmes in Igor Maslennikov's The Adventures of Sherlock Holmes and Dr. Watson (1980).

Since 1990s Klyuyev took part in Russian dubbing of foreign movies. He mostly voiced characters played by Alan Rickman, Christopher Lee and Geoffrey Rush. Klyuyev's most famous role in 2010s was grumpy and mocking pensioner Nikolai Petrovich Voronin in sitcom Voronin's Family.

Klyuev was diagnosed with lung cancer in May 2018. He died on September 1, 2020 in Moscow and was buried at the Troyekurovskoye Cemetery.

Selected filmography 

  1967: War and Peace (Война и мир) as a French soldier
 1968: Punisher (Каратель) as the prowler guard
 1969: The Red Tent (Красная палатка) as the reporter
 1971: The Fall of the Empire (Крушение империи) as Vasily Shulgin
 1978: D'Artagnan and Three Musketeers (д'Артаньян и три мушкетера) as Comte de Rochefort
 1979: Sherlock Holmes and Dr. Watson (Шерлок Холмс и доктор Ватсон) as Mycroft Holmes (uncredited)
 1980: Squadron of Flying Hussars (Эскадрон гусар летучих) as French officer
 1980: The Adventures of Sherlock Holmes and Dr. Watson (Приключения Шерлока Холмса и доктора Ватсона) as Mycroft Holmes
 1982: La vie de Berlioz (Жизнь Берлиоза) as Richard Wagner
 1982: Niccolò Paganini (Никколо Паганини) as Ferdinando Paer
 1984 / 1986: Mikhailo Lomonosov (Михайло Ломоносов) as Grigory Orlov
 1984: TASS Is Authorized to Declare... (ТАСС уполномочен заявить ... ) as Sergey Dubov (Agent 'Trianon')
 1986: The Twentieth Century Approaches (Приключения Шерлока Холмса и доктора Ватсона. Двадцатый век начинается) as Mycroft Holmes
 1986: Ballad of an Old Gun (Баллада о старом оружии) as SS officer
 1987: The End of Eternity (Конец Вечности) as Sociologist Voin
 1987: Moonzund (Моонзунд) as Von Grapf
 1989: The Criminal Quartet (Криминальный квартет) as the factory chief engineer
 1990: His Nickname Is Beast (…По прозвищу «Зверь») as the taciturn prisoner
 1991: Genius (Гений) as Aleksandr Arkhipov
 1991: Socrates (Сократ) as Critias
 1992: Dreams of Russia (Сны о России) as Russian naval officer
 1993: The Alaska Kid as Cameron Brody
 1993: Split (Раскол) as Grand Duke Sergei
 1997: Queen Margot (Королева Марго) as Duc de Guise
 1997: Schizophrenia (Шизофрения) as Lozovsky the banker
 2007: The Funeral Party (Весёлые похороны) as Lyova Gottlieb 
 2009 / 2019: Voronin's Family (Воронины) as Nikolai Petrovich Voronin
 2012: The Ballad of Uhlans (Уланская баллада) as Count Aleksey Arakcheyev
 2013 / 2015: Streets of Broken Lights (Улицы разбитых фонарей) as General Merzlyakin
 2018: Godunov (Годунов) as Dionysius, Metropolitan of Moscow

Dubbing 
 1977: The Rescuers as Mr. Chairman (Bernard Fox)
 1988: Oliver and Company ad Francis (Roscoe Lee Browne)
 1989: The Little Mermaid as King Triton (Kenneth Mars)
 1997: Fire Down Below as Jack Taggert (Steven Seagal) 
 1997: Anjo Mau as Ruy Novaes (Mauro Mendonça), Tadeu Facchini (Daniel Dantas), Américo Abreu (Sérgio Viotti), Júlio (Luciano Szafir)
 1999: Bowfinger as Hal (Barry Newman)
 1999: The Ninth Gate as Boris Balkan (Frank Langella)
 1999: The General's Daughter as Lieutenant General Joe Campbell (James Cromwell)
 1999: Sleepy Hollow as Baltus Van Tassel (Michael Gambon)
 2000: The Art of War as Douglas Thomas (Donald Sutherland)
 2000: How the Grinch Stole Christmas as Mayor Augustus MayWho (Jeffrey Tambor)
 2000: Battlefield Earth as Planetship Numph (Shaun Austin-Olsen)
 2000: Space Cowboys as General Vostov (Rade Šerbedžija)
 2001: The Lord of the Rings: The Fellowship of the Ring as Saruman (Christopher Lee)
 2001: Enigma as Admiral Trowbridge (Corin Redgrave)
 2001: American Pie 2 as Jim's Dad (Eugene Levy)
 2003: Johnny English as Pegasus (Tim Pigott-Smith)
 2004: The Prince and Me as Prime Minister (Henrik Jandorf)
 2004: The Aviator as Robert E. Gross (Brent Spiner)
 2004: Spartan as Robert Burch (Ed O'Neill)
 2004: The Terminal as Frank Dixon (Stanley Tucci)
 2004: Romasanta as Professor Philips (David Gant)
 2004: The Alibi as The Mormon (Sam Elliott)
 2005: Corpse Bride as Pastor Galswells (Christopher Lee)
 2005: 2001 Maniacs as Professor Ackerman (Peter Stormare)
 2006: The Good Shepherd as Dr. Fredericks (Michael Gambon)
 2006: Perfume: The Story of a Murderer as Antoine Richis (Alan Rickman)
 2006: Flushed Away as the Toad (Ian McKellen)
 2006: I Do as Francis Bertoff (Wladimir Yordanoff)
 2006: Man of the Year as President Kellogg (David Nichols)
 2007: Shooter as Mikhayo Sczerbiak / Michael Sandor (Rade Sherbedgia)
 2007: Awake as Dr. Jonathan Neyer (Arliss Howard)
 2007: Elizabeth: The Golden Age as Sir Francis Walsingham (Geoffrey Rush)
 2007: The Hunting Party as Franklin Harris (James Brolin)
 2007: Angel as Lord Norley (Christopher Benjamin)
 2008: The Tale of Despereaux as the Inquisitor
 2008: Superhero Movie as Dr. Whitby (Jeffrey Tambor)
 2010: The King's Speech as Lionel Logue (Geoffrey Rush)
 2011: Gnomeo and Juliet as Lord Redbrick (Michael Caine)
 2011: Rango as Tortoise John (Ned Beatty)
 2012: Gambit as Lord Lionel Shabandar (Alan Rickman)
 2012: The Best Offer as Virgil Oldman (Geoffrey Rush)
 2012: Killing Them Softly as the driver (Richard Jenkins)
 2015: Minions as the narrator (Geoffrey Rush)
 2016: Gods of Egypt as Ra (Geoffrey Rush)
 2018: Sherlock Gnomes as Lord Redbrick (Michael Caine)

Awards 
 Merited Artist of RSFSR (1989)
 Order of Friendship (1999)
 People's Artist of Russia (2002)
 Order of Honour (2008)
 TEFI (2012)
 Russian Federation Presidential Certificate of Honour (2015)
 Order "For Merit to the Fatherland", IV class (2019)

References

External links
 
 Словесный автопортрет: актер Борис Клюев

1944 births
2020 deaths
Deaths from cancer in Russia
Deaths from lung cancer
Honored Artists of the RSFSR
Male actors from Moscow
People's Artists of Russia
Recipients of the Order of Honour (Russia)
Recipients of the Order "For Merit to the Fatherland", 4th class
Russian male film actors
Russian male stage actors
Russian male television actors
Russian male voice actors
Soviet male film actors
Soviet male stage actors
Soviet male television actors
Soviet male voice actors
Burials in Troyekurovskoye Cemetery